List of V convocation deputies of the National Assembly of Azerbaijan were formed on the basis of the Azerbaijani parliamentary election in 2015.

71 of the 125 deputies of the National Assembly were members of the New Azerbaijan Party. Whole Azerbaijan Popular Front Party, Party for Democratic Reforms, Great Order Party, National Revival Movement Party, Social Democratic Party, Motherland Party, Azerbaijan Social Prosperity Party, Civic Solidarity Party, Unity Party, Civic Unity Party, Azerbaijan Democratic Enlightenment Party was represented by a deputy in the parliament. 42 members of the National Assembly were non-partisan. Chairman of the V convocation of the National Assembly is Ogtay Asadov, First Deputy Minister Ziyafat Asgarov and Deputy Chairmen of the Assembly Bahar Muradova and Valeh Alasgarov. 104 members of parliament were men and 21 were women.

Leadership

List of V convocation deputies of the National Assembly

References 

National Assembly (Azerbaijan)
Government ministers of Azerbaijan